Paul Savage (born May 28, 1935) is an American bobsledder. He competed in the four-man event at the 1968 Winter Olympics.

References

External links
 

1935 births
Living people
American male bobsledders
Olympic bobsledders of the United States
Bobsledders at the 1968 Winter Olympics
People from Essex County, New York